Linger is a surname. Notable people with the surname include:

Andreas Linger (born 1981), Austrian luger
Carl Linger (1810–1862), German Australian composer
Chelton Linger (born 1988), Dutch footballer
Christian Nicolaus von Linger (1669–1755), Prussian general of artillery
James Linger (born 1990), Australian baseball player
Ortwin Linger (1967–1989), Dutch-Surinamese footballer
Paul Linger (born 1974), English footballer
Wolfgang Linger (born 1982), Austrian luger